This list of alumni of Dartmouth College includes alumni and current students of Dartmouth College and its graduate schools. In addition to its undergraduate program, Dartmouth offers graduate degrees in nineteen departments and includes three graduate schools: the Tuck School of Business, the Thayer School of Engineering, and Dartmouth Medical School. Since its founding in 1769, Dartmouth has graduated  classes of students and today has approximately 66,500 living alumni.

This list uses the following notation:
D or unmarked years – recipient of Dartmouth College Bachelor of Arts
DMS – recipient of Dartmouth Medical School degree (Bachelor of Medicine 1797–1812, Doctor of Medicine 1812–present)
Th – recipient of any of several Thayer School of Engineering degrees (see Thayer School of Engineering#Academics)
T – recipient of Tuck School of Business Master of Business Administration, or graduate of other programs as indicated
M.A., M.A.L.S., M.S., Ph.D, etc. – recipient of indicated degree from an Arts and Sciences graduate program, or the historical equivalent

Academia and research

Academic administrators

Professors and researchers

MacArthur Fellows 
The MacArthur Fellows Program, sponsored by the MacArthur Foundation, is a research award commonly called the "Genius Grant."

Nobel laureates 
The Nobel Prizes are awarded each year for outstanding research, the invention of ground-breaking techniques or equipment, or outstanding contributions to society.

Architecture, engineering and building industry

Arts

Business and finance

Entertainment

Government, law, and public policy 
Note: Individuals who belong in multiple sections appear in the first relevant section.

United States federal and state court judges

Executive branch and United States Cabinet members

Members of the United States Congress 
Over 164 Dartmouth graduates have served in the United States Senate and United States House of Representatives.

Senators

Representatives

United States governors

Ambassadors and other diplomats from the United States

Government officials outside the U.S.

Other U.S. political and legal figures

Journalism and media

Bloggers

Literature, writing, and translation

Pulitzer Prize winners 
The Pulitzer Prize is an American award regarded as the highest national honor in print journalism, literary achievements, and musical compositions.

Medicine

Military

Religion

Social reform

Sports

Baseball

Basketball

Football

Ice hockey

Track and field

Other

Miscellaneous

Fictional people

See also 
 :Category:Dartmouth College alumni
 List of Dartmouth College faculty

References

External links 

 Dartmouth Alumni Magazine
 Dartmouth Office of Alumni Relations

Lists of people by university or college in New Hampshire